Coregonus arenicolus is a freshwater fish of the family Salmonidae found in Lake Constance (Switzerland, Germany and Austria).

References
 

arenicolus
Freshwater fish of Europe
Lake Constance
Vulnerable animals
Taxa named by Maurice Kottelat
Fish described in 1997